Robert Dale Brown (born December 15, 1971), known as Dale Brown, is a Canadian former professional boxer who competed from 1995 to 2007. As an amateur he represented Canada in the light heavyweight division at the 1992 Summer Olympics, losing to the eventual gold medallist Torsten May in the round of 16.

Professional career
Born in Calgary, Alberta, Brown has been a contender in the Cruiserweight division since the late 1990s. He has unsuccessfully challenged for a world title three times; losing by stoppage to Vassiliy Jirov and Jean-Marc Mormeck, and by decision to O'Neill Bell in a fight guest analyst Kevin Kelley scored in Brown's favour. In his most recent bouts, Brown lost a 5-round technical decision to Shane Swartz and was KO'd by Darnell Wilson.

Amateur career
As an amateur Brown represented Canada as a Light Heavyweight in the 1992 Barcelona Olympic Games. His results were:
Defeated Damidin Zul (Mongolia) RSC 2 (3:00)
Lost to Torsten May (Germany) 1-7

A year before his Olympic stint Brown won the bronze medal at the Pan American Games in Havana, Cuba. He did the same at the 1993 World Amateur Boxing Championships in Tampere, Finland.

Professional boxing record

|-
|align="center" colspan=8|35 Wins (22 knockouts, 13 decisions), 6 Losses (4 knockouts, 2 decisions), 1 Draw 
|-
| align="center" style="border-style: none none solid solid; background: #e3e3e3"|Result
| align="center" style="border-style: none none solid solid; background: #e3e3e3"|Record
| align="center" style="border-style: none none solid solid; background: #e3e3e3"|Opponent
| align="center" style="border-style: none none solid solid; background: #e3e3e3"|Type
| align="center" style="border-style: none none solid solid; background: #e3e3e3"|Round
| align="center" style="border-style: none none solid solid; background: #e3e3e3"|Date
| align="center" style="border-style: none none solid solid; background: #e3e3e3"|Location
| align="center" style="border-style: none none solid solid; background: #e3e3e3"|Notes
|-align=center
|Loss
|
|align=left| Darnell Wilson
|TKO
|2
|19/01/2007
|align=left| Edmonton, Alberta, Canada
|
|-
|Loss
|
|align=left| Shane Swartz
|TD
|5
|30/06/2006
|align=left| Hollywood, Florida, U.S.
|
|-
|Win
|
|align=left| Dennis McKinney
|UD
|6
|15/12/2005
|align=left| Hollywood, Florida, U.S.
|
|-
|Win
|
|align=left| Damon Reed
|TKO
|5
|27/08/2005
|align=left| Chestermere Lake, Alberta, Canada
|
|-
|Loss
|
|align=left| O'Neil Bell
|UD
|12
|20/05/2005
|align=left| Hollywood, Florida, U.S.
|align=left|
|-
|Win
|
|align=left| Shelby Gross
|TKO
|5
|04/02/2005
|align=left| Hollywood, Florida, U.S.
|
|-
|Win
|
|align=left| Jermell Barnes
|UD
|12
|28/10/2004
|align=left| Hollywood, Florida, U.S.
|
|-
|Win
|
|align=left| Robert Daniels
|SD
|12
|08/06/2004
|align=left| Hollywood, Florida, U.S.
|
|-
|Win
|
|align=left| Rich LaMontagne
|UD
|10
|01/08/2003
|align=left| Hampton Beach, New Hampshire, U.S.
|
|-
|Win
|
|align=left| Kevin Petty
|KO
|2
|14/03/2003
|align=left| Winnipeg, Manitoba, Canada
|
|-
|Loss
|
|align=left| Jean-Marc Mormeck
|TKO
|8
|10/08/2002
|align=left| Marseille, France
|align=left|
|-
|Win
|
|align=left| Yohan Gimenez
|TKO
|5
|31/05/2002
|align=left| Bucharest, Romania
|align=left|
|-
|Win
|
|align=left| Greg Wright
|UD
|12
|26/04/2002
|align=left| Mississauga, Ontario, Canada
|
|-
|Win
|
|align=left| Rick Roufus
|TKO
|9
|30/11/2001
|align=left| Montreal, Quebec, Canada
|
|-
|Win
|
|align=left| Chris Brown
|TKO
|1
|10/07/2001
|align=left| Montreal, Quebec, Canada
|
|-
|Win
|
|align=left| Sione Asipeli
|UD
|10
|03/11/2000
|align=left| Montreal, Quebec, Canada
|
|-
|Win
|
|align=left| Mike Peak
|UD
|8
|16/08/2000
|align=left| Montreal, Quebec, Canada
|
|-
|Win
|
|align=left| Willard Lewis
|TKO
|7
|16/06/2000
|align=left| Montreal, Quebec, Canada
|align=left|
|-
|Win
|
|align=left| Matthew Charleston
|TKO
|2
|09/05/2000
|align=left| Montreal, Quebec, Canada
|align=left|
|-
|Loss
|
|align=left| Wayne Braithwaite
|TKO
|8
|12/02/2000
|align=left| Uncasville, Connecticut, U.S.
|align=left|
|-
|Win
|
|align=left| Wesley Martin
|UD
|8
|29/10/1999
|align=left| Montreal, Quebec, Canada
|align=left|
|-
|Loss
|
|align=left| Vassiliy Jirov
|KO
|10
|18/09/1999
|align=left| Las Vegas, Nevada, U.S.
|align=left|
|-
|Win
|
|align=left| Sajad Abdul Aziz
|UD
|12
|28/05/1999
|align=left| Montreal, Quebec, Canada
|align=left|
|-
|Win
|
|align=left| Val Smith
|TKO
|2
|05/02/1999
|align=left| Montreal, Quebec, Canada
|align=left|
|-
|Win
|
|align=left| David Washington
|TKO
|8
|14/10/1998
|align=left| Montreal, Quebec, Canada
|align=left|
|-
|Win
|
|align=left| Leslie Stewart
|UD
|12
|28/05/1998
|align=left| White Plains, New York, U.S.
|align=left|
|-
|Win
|
|align=left| Art Jimmerson
|KO
|3
|03/04/1998
|align=left| Montreal, Quebec, Canada
|align=left|
|-
|Win
|
|align=left| Robert Folley
|DQ
|6
|11/11/1997
|align=left| Montreal, Quebec, Canada
|align=left|
|-
|Win
|
|align=left| Bobby Crabtree
|KO
|1
|04/10/1997
|align=left| Lethbridge, Alberta, Canada
|align=left|
|-
|Win
|
|align=left| Leon Gray
|MD
|10
|04/07/1997
|align=left| Nanaimo, British Columbia, Canada
|align=left|
|-
|Win
|
|align=left| Brian LaSpada
|TKO
|8
|05/05/1997
|align=left| Calgary, Alberta, Canada
|align=left|
|-
|Win
|
|align=left| Marcelo Aravena
|TKO
|5
|20/02/1997
|align=left| Winnipeg, Manitoba, Canada
|align=left|
|-
|Draw
|
|align=left| Brian LaSpada
|TD
|6
|18/08/1996
|align=left| Calgary, Alberta, Canada
|align=left|
|-
|Win
|
|align=left| Teddy Adeoba
|TKO
|2
|31/05/1996
|align=left| Victoria, British Columbia, Canada
|align=left|
|-
|Win
|
|align=left| Shawn Elliott
|TKO
|2
|11/04/1996
|align=left| Vancouver, British Columbia, Canada
|align=left|
|-
|Win
|
|align=left| Dave Fiddler
|TKO
|2
|12/03/1996
|align=left| Winnipeg, Manitoba, Canada
|align=left|
|-
|Win
|
|align=left| Derrell Banks
|UD
|6
|25/01/1996
|align=left| Toronto, Ontario, Canada
|align=left|
|-
|Win
|
|align=left| Donnie Penelton
|TKO
|4
|14/12/1995
|align=left| Winnipeg, Manitoba, Canada
|align=left|
|-
|Win
|
|align=left| Dean Shannon
|KO
|1
|25/10/1995
|align=left| Edmonton, Alberta, Canada
|align=left|
|-
|Win
|
|align=left| Maurice Harris
|KO
|3
|16/08/1995
|align=left| Newark, New Jersey, U.S.
|align=left|
|-
|Win
|
|align=left| Dan Laliberte
|KO
|4
|23/05/1995
|align=left| Nanaimo, British Columbia, Canada
|align=left|
|-
|Win
|
|align=left| Thaddeus Carney
|TKO
|1
|28/04/1995
|align=left| Bushkill, Pennsylvania, U.S.
|align=left|
|}

References

External links
 
 
 
 
 

1971 births
Living people
Canadian male boxers
Light-heavyweight boxers
Cruiserweight boxers
Olympic boxers of Canada
Boxers at the 1992 Summer Olympics
Commonwealth Games gold medallists for Canada
Commonwealth Games silver medallists for Canada
Commonwealth Games medallists in boxing
Boxers at the 1990 Commonwealth Games
Boxers at the 1994 Commonwealth Games
Pan American Games bronze medalists for Canada
Pan American Games medalists in boxing
Boxers at the 1991 Pan American Games
AIBA World Boxing Championships medalists
Canadian people of British descent
Sportspeople from Calgary
Medalists at the 1991 Pan American Games
20th-century Canadian people
21st-century Canadian people
Medallists at the 1990 Commonwealth Games
Medallists at the 1994 Commonwealth Games